Bhavani Peth is a Marathi language name for a locality in the Indian state of Maharashtra. This includes cities such as Pune, Solapur, Madhavnagar, Karad and Ahmednagar. The term Bhavani was derived from the Goddess Bhavani. The Goddess has a famous temple in Tuljapur in the Solapur district.

Bhawani Peth is an important center of the timber trade and has a thriving hardware and steel market. The market caters to the civil and allied industry.

References

Further reading
Hindu Goddesses: Vision of the Divine Feminine in the Hindu Religious Traditions by David Kinsley

Geography of Maharashtra